Wilsman is an unincorporated community located in Eagle Township in LaSalle County, Illinois, United States.

References

Unincorporated communities in Illinois
Unincorporated communities in LaSalle County, Illinois
Ottawa, IL Micropolitan Statistical Area